Lars Jonsson or Jönsson may refer to:

Lars Jonsson (illustrator) (born 1952), ornithological illustrator
Lars Jonsson (ice hockey) (born 1982), Swedish ice hockey player
Lars Theodor Jonsson (1903–1998), Swedish cross country skier
Lars Jönsson (tennis) (born 1970), Swedish tennis player
Lars Jönsson (film producer), Swedish film producer